A Bad Brains Reunion Live at Maritime Hall is the third live album from hardcore punk and reggae pioneers Bad Brains. It marks the reunion of the band after a four-year breakup. At the time, the band were unable to use the name "Bad Brains" as they were embattled in legal turmoil with their prior management company. For over three years, the band had to tour under the name "Soul Brains" even though the original lineup of Bad Brains was intact.

The album came under sharp criticism upon its release due to the lazy singing style of the usually manic and energetic H.R., who was accused of mailing in his performance at this reunion concert recorded live in 1999 at the Maritime Hall theater in San Francisco. Moreover, many of the tracks had already appeared on the previous two live Bad Brains albums.

One new song—"On Like Popcorn"—was also released as a single in preparation for a new studio album, but the band broke up once again in 2000. It was later included on their 2012 studio album Into the Future.

Track listing
"Attitude" – 1:43
"Coptic Times" – 2:27
"At the Movies" – 2:44
"Right Brigade" – 2:36
"Day Tripper"/"She's a Rainbow" – 5:52
"Soulcraft" – 2:25
"Tongue Tee Tie" – 3:08
"Re-Ignition" – 6:47
"Sailin' On"/"I & I Survive" – 8:52
"House of Suffering " – 2:20
"On Like Popcorn" – 3:20
"Sacred Love" – 3:47
"Youth Are Getting Restless" – 6:46
"Pay to Cum" – 2:22
"I Against I" – 3:12

Personnel
 H.R. – vocals
 Dr. Know – guitar
 Darryl Jenifer – bass
 Earl Hudson – drums

Bad Brains live albums
1999 live albums